Happys Inn is a census-designated place (CDP) in Lincoln County, Montana, United States. The population was 164 at the 2010 census.

Happys Inn has a bar that carries its namesake. The census area extends for  down the length of the chain of lakes area of Lincoln County.

Demographics

References

Census-designated places in Lincoln County, Montana
Census-designated places in Montana